A by-election for the seat of Casuarina in the Northern Territory Legislative Assembly was held on 18 October 2014. The by-election was triggered by the resignation of Labor MP Kon Vatskalis, who retained the seat at the 2012 election with a 59.3 percent primary and two-party vote. It was held on the same day as the 2014 Vasse by-election in Western Australia.

Candidates
The seven candidates in ballot paper order were:

Results

See also
List of Northern Territory by-elections

References

External links
2014 Casuarina by-election: Antony Green ABC

2014 elections in Australia
Northern Territory by-elections
2010s in the Northern Territory